Tomislav Gabrić (born 17 August 1995) is a Croatian professional basketball player for Kaposvári KK of the Nemzeti Bajnokság I/A, the top division in Hungary.

References

External links
 Profile at aba-liga.com
 Profile at eurobasket.com
 Profile at baschetromania.ro
 Profile at FIBA

1995 births
Living people
ABA League players
Astoria Bydgoszcz players
Basketball players from Šibenik
BK Ventspils players
Croatian expatriate basketball people in Serbia
Croatian men's basketball players
CSU Pitești players
EWE Baskets Oldenburg players
Forwards (basketball)
GKK Šibenik players
KK Cibona players
KK Metalac Valjevo players
KK Split players
Universo Treviso Basket players